Nawae District is a district of the Morobe Province of Papua New Guinea.  Its capital is Boana.  The population of the district was 44,556 at the 2011 census.

References

Districts of Papua New Guinea
Morobe Province